was a city located within Saitama Prefecture, Japan.

As of 2003, the city had an estimated population of 109,580 and the density of 2,229.05 persons per km². The total area was 49.16 km².

On April 1, 2005, Iwatsuki was merged into the expanded city of Saitama, effectively the former city becomes Iwatsuki-ku.

The city was founded on July 1, 1954 by turning  in South Saitama District into a district-independent city.

Dissolved municipalities of Saitama Prefecture
Populated places established in 1954
Populated places disestablished in 2005
2005 disestablishments in Japan